The 2002 CAF Cup was the 11th edition of the CAF Cup, the African continental club competition for runners up of the respective domestic leagues. It was won by Algerian team JS Kabylie who beat Tonnerre Yaoundé of Cameroon 4–1 over two legs in the final. With the win, JS Kabylie became the first and only side to win the competition three times in a row, and kept the trophy.

First round

|}

1Kabwe Warriors withdrew before the first leg
One team received a bye : JS Kabylie (Algeria)

Second round

|}

Quarter-finals

|}

Semi-finals

|}

JS Kabylie won 2–1 on aggregate and advanced to the final.

2–2 on aggregate, Tonnerre Yaoundé won on away goals rule and advanced to the final.

Finals

First Leg

Second Leg

JS Kabylie win 4-1 on aggregate

Champions

See also
2002 CAF Champions League
CAF Cup

External links
Results at RSSSF.com

 
2002
3